Lisieux Cathedral is a Catholic church located in Lisieux, France.

The present cathedral was built between 1170 and the middle of the 13th century through the initiative of Bishop Arnulf. It was the seat of the Bishop of Lisieux until the diocese of Lisieux was abolished under the Concordat of 1801 and merged into the Diocese of Bayeux. The edifice is 110 meters and is a national monument.

The west front of the building consists of three portals surmounted by two towers. The south tower was built in the 16th century and at the top bears a 17th-century flèche. Buttresses were added to the south face in the 15th century. The cathedral survived World War II wholly intact, although the town suffered Allied bombing in 1944.

From the outset, the architect designed quadripartite rib vaults and flying buttresses, making it one of Normandy’s first Gothic buildings. The nave is fairly austere and is inspired by the Gothic architectural style of the Île de France, whereas the most recent parts of the building were constructed in the 18th century (the chevet, the lantern tower and the western façade) in Norman style.

An earlier cathedral is presumed to have existed since the 6th century, as there was a Bishop of Lisieux from that time, but nothing is known of the earlier edifice.

It is wrongly claimed  that Henry Plantagenet, Count of Anjou, Duke of Normandy and future king of England, married Eleanor of Aquitaine at the cathedral in 1152. In fact they married in Poitiers Cathedral. Having been involved in the trial of Joan of Arc, Pierre Cauchon was named as Bishop of Lisieux in 1432 and is buried there.

See also
List of Gothic Cathedrals in Europe
Basilica of Sainte-Thérèse, Lisieux

References

External links

Location

Churches in Calvados (department)
Lisieux
Former cathedrals in France
Churches completed in 1170
1170s establishments in France
12th-century Roman Catholic church buildings in France